Body Music may refer to:

Books
Body Music, a 1998 poetry collection by Dennis Lee
Body Music, a 2017 graphic novel by Jul Maroh

Music
Body Music (album), a 2013 pop album by AlunaGeorge
Body music, or body percussion, music produced by the body
Body music, for dancing, as opposed to head music for thinking
Body Music, a 1993 avant-garde album by Ellen Fullman
Body Music, a 1973 performance art video by Charlemagne Palestine
"Body Music", a 1980 song by Modern Man
"Body Music", a 1981 song by Chris Rainbow
"Body Music", a 1981 song by The Strikers
"Body Music", a 1986 song by Pauline Murray and The Storm